"Fish Heads" is a novelty song by comedy rock duo Barnes & Barnes, released as a single in 1978 and later featured on their 1980 album Voobaha. It is the most requested song on the Dr. Demento radio show, and a music video for the song made in 1980 was in regular rotation on MTV. The song was featured on Barnes & Barnes' 1982 Fish Heads (Greatest Hits) 12-inch on Rhino Records.

The lyrics are an absurdist celebration of fish heads, describing them in the high-pitched chorus as "roly poly" and delicious to eat. The verses describe various things they (mostly) cannot do such as play baseball, wear sweaters, and play the drums.

Actor Bill Paxton, a filmmaker at the time, directed and appeared in the music video for the song, along with cinematographer Rocky Schenck and Robert Haimer's girlfriend at the time, Joan Farber, who designed the costume look. The video aired on NBC television on Saturday Night Live, on December 6, 1980 and the following week. Dr. Demento had a cameo as the bum.

The song is featured in The Simpsons episode "Treehouse of Horror VII".  Alan Arkin sings the song in the 1993 movie Indian Summer. In the 2017 television episode "Goodwill" of Halt and Catch Fire Joe and Haley listen to the song while driving in Joe's car.

Cover versions
 Wild Man Fischer released a cover of "Fish Heads" on his album Pronounced Normal.
 Buck 65 recorded a cover of "Fish Heads" set to the music of Wire's "Three Girl Rhumba". The cover appears on a 2007, tour-only CD-R titled, Heck.

References

Novelty songs
1978 songs
1978 singles
Comedy songs
Songs about fish